William F. Jasper is an American journalist and author, and a senior editor of The New American, and long-time member of the John Birch Society.

Background

William F. Jasper was born in Madison, Wisconsin.  He grew up in the Pacific Northwest.  He received a bachelor's degree in child psychology and education from the University of Idaho.

Career

In 1976, Jasper joined the John Birch Society as a researcher.  Soon he began to write for its magazines, American Opinion and The Review of the News, and when they merged in 1985, for The New American.  In 1990 he became a senior editor.

Jasper has written on "foreign and domestic politics, national security, education, immigration, constitutional issues, the culture war, and most notably, the United Nations." He has appeared on radio and television programs.

Personal life
Jasper married Carmen, with whom he had two sons.

Works
Jasper discusses the Oklahoma City Bombing in the 2004 documentary Conspiracy?

His essay "Increased Federal Funding Is Wasteful" appears in the 1994 book Water:  Opposing Viewpoints as an example of a right-wing position.  His essay "Militias Can Achieve Their Goals Through Peaceful Means" appears in the 1997 book The Militia Movement.  His essay "Subversion Through Perversion" appears in the 2006 book Good Reasons with Contemporary Arguments as an example of right-wing writings.  His name, book Global Tyranny (1992), and essays "Reviewing the Rhodes Legacy" (1995) and "Why Not World Government" (1996) appear in the 2005 book Freedom, a Fading Illusion.  His essay "ObamaCare: The Plan Is to Transition to 'Single-Payer' Socialized Medicine" appears in the 2014 book The Affordable Care Act.

Books
 Global Tyranny-Step by Step: The United Nations and the Emerging New World Order. Appleton, Wisconsin: Western Islands, December 1992.  . 350 pages. Bibliography available.
 The United Nations Exposed: The Internationalist Conspiracy to Rule the World. Appleton, Wisconsin: John Birch Society, 2001.  . 338 pages.

References

External links
 William F. Jasper at History Commons
 William F. Jasper at IMDb
 William F. Jasper at WorldCat
 Works by William F. Jasper at Muck Rack

American columnists
American male non-fiction writers
American political activists
American political commentators
American political writers
University of Idaho alumni
Living people
Year of birth missing (living people)
John Birch Society members